James V. "Jimmy" Henley (September 2, 1963 - March 22, 2020) was an American banjo player who played bluegrass music. He won several banjo contests as a young boy. As a young boy he met country music star Roy Clark at the New Mexico State Fair and Clark invited him to perform on National television.

Early life
He was born and raised in Hobbs, New Mexico. When he was seven years old he won the Junior Division of the National Bluegrass Banjo Championship at Bill Grant’s Bluegrass Festival in Hugo, Oklahoma. At ten years old he won the World Bluegrass Banjo Championship in Memphis, Tennessee.

Career
After his contest winning success performing banjo as a child, multi-instrumentalist Roy Clark met Henley at the New Mexico State Fair. He then appeared on the television show Hee Haw and on many other nationally televised programs. Including: The Mike Douglas Show, the Merv Griffin Show, the Tonight Show. Later he toured with Roy Clark. In 2007 he was touring with his band "Jimmy Henley and A Touch of Grass". 

On March 22, 2020 he died of throat cancer at his home in Broken Arrow, Oklahoma.

Legacy
The guitarist John 5 has claimed Jimmy Henley as one of his inspirations.  When John 5 was seven years old he watched Jimmy Henley play banjo on the family variety show Hee Haw. In an interview John 5 said, ""It's crazy there's this exact moment when I realized I wanted to play, it changed my life."

References

External links
Jimmy Henley IMDb
Video - "Orange Blossom Special" - Roy Clark & Jimmy Henley
 

1963 births
2020 deaths
American banjoists
20th-century American male musicians
Country musicians from New Mexico
People from Hobbs, New Mexico